Güsten is a town in the district of Salzlandkreis, in Saxony-Anhalt, Germany. It is situated on the river Wipper, west of Bernburg. It is part of the Verbandsgemeinde ("collective municipality") Saale-Wipper. It absorbed the former municipality Amesdorf in January 2010.

Notable people 

 Arno Philippsthal (1887-1933), physician and one of the first Jewish victims of the National Socialist rule in Berlin
 Ernst-Otto Reher (1936-2016), process engineer and professor, pioneer of technical rheology
 Fritz Siedentopf (1908–1944), communist and resistance fighter against Nazism.
 Julius Kraaz (1822-1889), lawyer, sugar producer and member of the German Reichstag, died in Güsten

References

Towns in Saxony-Anhalt
Salzlandkreis
Duchy of Anhalt